Vargem Grande is a city in Maranhão state. Its population is 57,168 (2020) and its total area is 1,958 km2.

References

Municipalities in Maranhão